Richard Buchanan may refer to:

 Richard Buchanan (politician) (1912–2003), British Labour politician
 Richard Buchanan (American football) (born 1969), former American football player
 Richard Buchanan (academic), late  20th century American professor of design